Neoterebra dislocata, common name the eastern auger, is a species of sea snail, a marine gastropod mollusk in the family Terebridae, the auger snails.

Description
The eastern auger Terebra dislocata measures on average up to 2 1/4 inches in length, with a pointed spire. The color varies but is often a pale grey or tan.

Distribution
The species is found from Virginia to Brazil.

Ecology 
This species lives in sounds and offshore on shallow sand flats. The shell is commonly found washed up on sound and ocean beaches.

The Atlantic auger is a carnivore, but it lacks the radula and poison gland found in most other augers.

References

External links
 Fedosov, A. E.; Malcolm, G.; Terryn, Y.; Gorson, J.; Modica, M. V.; Holford, M.; Puillandre, N. (2020). Phylogenetic classification of the family Terebridae (Neogastropoda: Conoidea). Journal of Molluscan Studies
 Say, T. (1822). An account of some of the marine shells of the United States. Journal of the Academy of Natural Sciences, Philadelphia. 2(2): 221-248, 257-276, 302-325
 Kiener L.C. (1834-1841). Spécies général et iconographie des coquilles vivantes. Vol. 9. Famille des Purpurifères. Deuxième partie. Genres Colombelle, (Columbella), Lamarck, pp. 1-63, pl. 1-16 [pp. 1-63 (1841); pl. 2-4, 6, 8, 11 (1840), 1, 5, 7, 9-10, 12-16 (1841)]; Buccin (Buccinum), Adanson, pp. 1–112 + table with duplicate page numbers 105-108, pl. 1-31 [pp. 1–64 (1834), 65-104 and 105-108 of table (1835), 105-112 of text (1841); pl. 1-24 (1834), 25-29 (1835), 30-31 (1841); Eburne (Eburna), Lamarck, pp. 1–8, pl. 1-3 [all (1835)]; Struthiolaire (Struthiolaria), Lamarck, pp. 1–6, pl. 1-2 [pp]. 1-6 (1838); pl. 1-2 (1837)]; Vis (Terebra, Bruguière, pp. 1–42 + table, pl. 1-14 [pp. 1–42 (1838); pl. 1-14 (1837)]. Paris, Rousseau & J.B. Baillière

Terebridae
Gastropods described in 1822